Neil Gow may refer to:

 Neil Gow race horse
 Neil A. R. Gow (born 1957), a professor of Microbiology at the University of Aberdeen

See also
 Niel Gow